The Boston bread riot was the last of a series of three riots by the poor of Boston, Massachusetts, between 1710 and 1713, in response to food shortages and high bread prices. The riot ended with minimal casualties.

Riot 
In the early 18th century, the city of Boston had very little arable land, and most grain had to be imported from surrounding areas or from abroad. It was common practice for the larger local grain merchants to hoard grain to drive up local prices, and to sell local grain in more lucrative foreign markets such as Europe or the sugar plantations of the West Indies. On top of this, Queen Anne's War (1702–1713) interfered with foreign trade. By 1709, Boston was experiencing a serious food shortage and skyrocketing bread prices.

The hardest hit were the working poor. Since they did not own land, and were therefore not allowed to vote, governmental indifference to their needs left violence as the only effective recourse. A percentage of the poor began an uprising against the government.

In April 1710, a group of men broke the rudder of a cargo ship belonging to merchant Andrew Belcher, to stop its cargo of wheat from being shipped away and sold abroad. The next day, about 50 men attempted to force the ship's captain ashore, intending to loot the ship of its grain. They were arrested, but popular support for their cause resulted in them being released without charges.

In October 1711, a fire in Boston left over 100 families homeless, leading to a second riot.

In May 1713, a mob of more than 200 rioted on Boston Common, protesting high bread prices. As well as attacking Belcher's ships, the mob "broke into his warehouses looking for corn, and shot the lieutenant governor when he tried to interfere."

Results 
After the Boston Bread Riot, acts were passed prohibiting exports of grain in time of shortage, fixing grain and bread prices at more reasonable levels, and establishing a public granary. These measures somewhat alleviated the immediate shortage; however, food shortages and the attendant rioting and looting recurred in Boston throughout the American Revolution and into the early 19th century.

See also
 List of food riots

Notes 

1713 riots
Riots and civil disorder in Massachusetts
Food riots
History of Boston
18th century in Boston